Claire Coggins (born May 19, 1985) is a former American professional basketball player and coach who played one season in the WNBA for the Chicago Sky. She played college basketball at Kansas State where she was award Big 12 Conference honors. She also spent 3 years coaching  as an assistant for Connors State College, Oklahoma City University, and Kansas State.

College career
Coggins played her colligate career at Kansas State. She earned two all-Big 12 selections and ended her career with 1,236 points, the 32nd Wildcat to pass the 1,000-point mark. Coggins was a member of the 2004 Big 12 Championship team, as well as the MVP of the 2006 Women's National Invitation Tournament.

Professional career
Coggins went undrafted during the 2007 WNBA Draft.

Chicago Sky
Though she was undrafted, Coggins signed a training camp contract with the Chicago Sky in 2007. She went through training camp and made the team for the 2007 season. Coggins appeared in 20 games during her rookie year, and scored a career-high 10 points on June 7, 2007 against the Phoenix Mercury.

Panathinaikos
Following her season with Chicago, Coggins signed to play in Athens for Panathinaikos for the 2008 season.

WNBA career statistics

Regular season

|-
| align="left" | 2007
| align="left" | Chicago
| 20 || 1 || 9.8 || .247 || .200 || .250 || 0.8 || 0.4 || 0.3 || 0.1 || 1.0 || 2.5
|-
| align="left" | Career
| align="left" | 1 year, 1 team
| 20 || 1 || 9.8 || .247 || .200 || .250 || 0.8 || 0.4 || 0.3 || 0.1 || 1.0 || 2.5

Coaching career
After playing in Athens, Coggins began a coaching career at the colligate level. She started off at Connors State College, where she spent two years as an assistant. After that Coggins moved over to Oklahoma City University, where she spent one year.

Coggins returned to her alma mater in 2012 when she became the Wildcats Video Coordinator. She was promoted to the Director of Team Operations the following year, and then promoted again to Assistant Coach for the 2014-2015 season. After the season, Coggins resigned from her Assistant Coach position.

Personal life
Coggins is married to current UTSA Roadrunners women's basketball head coach Karen Aston. The two have a daughter together.

References

External links
WNBA bio

1980 births
Living people
American women's basketball players
Basketball players from Missouri
Guards (basketball)
Kansas State Wildcats women's basketball players
Chicago Sky players